Gungal may refer to:

Gungal, Ranga Reddy, village in India
Gungal, New South Wales, locality in Australia